The Roman Spring of Mrs. Stone is a 1961 British romantic drama film made by Warner Bros. It was directed by José Quintero and produced by Louis de Rochemont with Lothar Wolff as associate producer. The screenplay was written by Gavin Lambert and Jan Read and based on the novel by Tennessee Williams. The music score was by Richard Addinsell and the cinematography by Harry Waxman.

This was the only theatrically released film directed by José Quintero.

Plot
Karen Stone, an acclaimed American stage actress and her businessman husband are off on holiday to Rome. On the plane, her husband, a multi- millionaire, suffers a fatal heart attack. Karen decides to stay in Italy and rent a luxury apartment in Rome. She has no reason to go home. She shut down her latest play, Shakespeare's "As You Like It" because she realizes she is far too old to play Rosalind. A year later, the Contessa Magda Terribili-Gonzales, a procurer, introduces her to a handsome, well-dressed, narcissistic young Italian named Paolo, who is one in her stable of professional gigolos.

Magda plots and plans, telling Paolo that Mrs. Stone has just begun to taste loneliness. Paolo and Mrs. Stone go out for dinner and dancing, but no more. Eventually, she begins the affair. She falls in love with him; he pretends to love her. She believes that she is different from other mature women he has known. Her self-deception is aided by the fact that she does not actually pay him, but buys him expensive clothes and gifts, including a movie camera, and pays his bills through charge accounts. They become the subject of gossip columns. It soon becomes obvious that Paolo is only interested in himself. Eventually he is bored by Mrs. Stone's possessiveness and pursues an American starlet.

Abandoned  by Paolo, ridiculed by the Contessa, with her only real friend, Meg, on a plane to New York, Mrs. Stone looks over her balcony and sees the ragged, mysteriously menacing young man who has followed her everywhere since the day she moved in, pacing. She tosses the keys of her apartment down to him and walks back inside, remembering what she told Paolo after he tried to frighten her with a story about a middle-aged woman murdered on the French Riviera by someone she invited into her apartment: "All I need is three or four years. After that, a cut throat would be a convenience". She lights a cigarette and sits down to wait. The youth comes into the apartment and walks toward her slowly, hands deep in the pockets of his filthy coat, smiling faintly as his shadow fills the screen.

Cast

Awards and nominations
Lotte Lenya was nominated for an Oscar for Best Supporting Actress.

2003 version

In 2003, an Emmy-award-winning made-for-cable version was produced for Showtime Networks starring Helen Mirren, Anne Bancroft, and Olivier Martinez.

See also
 Male prostitution
 Gigolo
 Male prostitution in the arts
 Female sex tourism
 American Gigolo

References

External links
 
 
 
 
 
 
 

1961 romantic drama films
British drama films
Films shot at Associated British Studios
Films scored by Richard Addinsell
Films based on American novels
Films set in Rome
Warner Bros. films
Films based on works by Tennessee Williams
1960s English-language films
1960s British films